Ponjola is a 1923 American silent drama film based on the 1923 novel of the same name by Cynthia Stockley and directed by Donald Crisp. The film stars Anna Q. Nilsson in a role in which she masquerades as a man.

Cast

Preservation
A print of Ponjola is held by a private collector.

References

External links

Cover from a reprint of Cynthia Stockley's book(Wayback)
Newspaper advertisement for the film version
Still of Anna Q. Nilsson getting her hair cut for the film at gettyimages.com

1923 films
1923 drama films
Silent American drama films
American silent feature films
American black-and-white films
Cross-dressing in American films
Films based on British novels
Films directed by Donald Crisp
First National Pictures films
1920s American films